Komnina is a settlement in the municipal unit of Stavroupoli of the municipality of Xanthi in the Xanthi regional unit of Greece. It is located 9 kilometers southeast of Stavroupoli and 31.5 kilometers from Xanthi. In 1981, the population of Komnina was around 365 inhabitants. In 1991, the population rose to around 443 inhabitants. In 2001 the population was 332.

External links
Greek Travel Pages - Komnina

Populated places in Xanthi (regional unit)